Carrie Anne or Carrie-Anne is a blended name combining Carrie and Anne that is an English feminine given name derived from the names Karl and Hannah. Notable people referred to by this name include the following:

Given name
Carrie Ann Inaba (born 1968), American television personality
Carrie-Anne Moss (born 1967), Canadian actress
Carrie Anne Philbin, English teacher of computer science and author
Carrie Anne Savage, known as Carrie Savage,  American voice actress

Fictional character
Carrie Anne Mathison, known as Carrie Mathison, Claire Danes Homeland character

See also

Carrie Ann

Notes

English feminine given names